Gymnocarpos bracteatus is a species of plant in the family Caryophyllaceae. It is endemic to Yemen.  Its natural habitat is subtropical or tropical dry shrubland.

References

Endemic flora of Socotra
Caryophyllaceae
Vulnerable plants
Taxonomy articles created by Polbot
Taxa named by Isaac Bayley Balfour